Peter Hoffmann (born 1 July 1, 1956) is an Edinburgh author and former international sportsman.

Early life and education 
Born in Edinburgh, Peter Hoffmann was brought up in Oxgangs, Edinburgh and educated at Hunters Tryst Primary School and Boroughmuir High School. His mother attended the University of Edinburgh in 1954, and his father was a chief officer in the merchant navy who trained at the Edinburgh shipping company, Ben Line Agencies.  In 1976 Hoffmann began studying for a degree in English and sports science and recreation management at Loughborough University but decided to leave shortly after starting the course. He instead graduated from Edinburgh Napier University with a BA in Business Studies (1981) and Dunfermline College of Physical Education with a postgraduate Diploma Recreation and Leisure Practice (1983).

Career 
For 25 years Hoffmann worked in the field of education, culture and sport in Midlothian and the Highlands, and for more than 10 years at chief officer level. He has written occasional articles for The Scotsman and Lothian Life.

He has written books on Edinburgh, sport and social history as well as biography and a fictional love story set in Edinburgh between the years 1960 and 1963.
 
He is the author of the recently published book Audacity and Idiocy: A Scottish Athlete’s 1978 Commonwealth Games Journal (2022) to coincide with the Commonwealth Games in Birmingham. It is the final book in a pentalogy of 5 athletics based books - A Life In A Day In A Year: A Postcard From Meadowbank, 1973-1978 (2017) which captures the Scottish athletics scene of the 1970s featuring such athletes as Roger Jenkins (banker) David Jenkins (sprinter) and Paul Forbes encapsulating the social culture of the Edinburgh era of the 1970s; Festina Lente - A Practical Philosophy of 800 Metres Running: The True Confessions Of Retep Nnamffoh: School's Out For Ever, A 1973 Edinburgh Young Athlete's Diary (2018); and You Can Run But You Can't Outrun Yourself: A 1950s Edinburgh Love Story (2021).

In 2021 Hoffmann authored the book Two Worlds telling the remarkable story of (Dr.) Arthur Philip Motley a Black American who as a young man left his home in McAlester City Oklahoma in 1928 to travel the 4351 miles across America and the Atlantic Ocean to come to Edinburgh Scotland to fulfil his dream to become a doctor going on to become a legendary figure in the community of Oxgangs. 

Through their diaries, The Letts’ Schoolboys follows, tracks and contrasts the daily lives of five fellow British schoolboy diarists -  T.G. Richards aged 15 in 1918 from Swansea Wales; English schoolboys G.D.B. (Gordon) Goodall from Worcester aged 14 at the beginning of 1930; Kenneth Holder aged 14 in 1935 from Woking; Derek Foster, aged 15 in 1940 who lives in Harrow but attends Dulwich College London during school-term; and their Scottish compatriot from across the years and the decades and the border, Peter Hoffmann, aged 14 in 1971, who attends Edinburgh’s Boroughmuir Senior Secondary School. Covering a period of over half a century the book follows their day to day lives in their own words including Spanish Flu, Test Matches, Churchill’s most famous speech, the German-France Armistice and even a World War 1 baseball match held in Swansea between Canada and the USA.

Sporting career 
Between 1974 and 1978 Hoffmann made fourteen international appearances for Scotland at 400, 800 and 4 x 400 metres relay. He was a British Junior International in 1974 and 1975 at 400 meters and 4 x 400 metres and between 1975 and 1978 also represented Great Britain at 400, 800 and 4 x 400 metres. In 1978 he was a Great Britain internationalist indoors over 800 metres. Representing Great Britain at the 1975 European Junior Championships he won a silver medal in the 400 metres. He was a member of the British Olympic 4 x 400 metres relay squad at Montreal, 1976. In 1978 he represented Scotland at the Commonwealth Games in Edmonton in the 800 metres and 4 x 400 metres relay. He had an unusually wide range winning the Scottish 50 metres indoor sprint as well as the British (AAA) 800 metres. Between 1973 and 1978 Hoffmann won 10 Scottish titles at Youth, Junior and Senior level; broke the Scottish Native 400 metres record on 3 occasions and won 7 AAAs medals at 200, 400 and 800 metres. He partnered Sebastian Coe and Steve Ovett as the UK's third representative at the 1978 European Athletics Championships Men's 800 metres in Prague. In addition to winning AAA's titles at 400 and 800 metres Hoffmann took the silver medal behind Coe at the 1978 UK Athletics Championships.

In 2016 he represented Scotland at the 4 Nations Home Fencing Veterans’ International at epee.

Personal life 
He lives in the Highlands and is married with two sons, Will and Tom; the latter is an international epeeist and was part of the successful Scotland team which won the bronze medal at the 2014 Commonwealth Fencing Championships and the 2018 Commonwealth Fencing Championships. With the closure of Meadowbank Stadium Hoffmann founded the Memory Hold The Door-Meadowbank Sports Centre legacy project allowing people from throughout the world to record their memories, stories, experiences, photographs and other memorabilia of the facility. In 2018 he also launched a similar project Oxgangs - A Pastime From Time Past - Spirits Across The Air which has been edited into the first volume of a projected small series. His hobbies include literature, painting, fencing and exercising. Hoffmann made a cameo appearance in the film Chariots Of Fire in the scene featuring the Scotland v Ireland international.

Books 
 2012: The Stair An Oxgangs Edinburgh Childhood 1958-1972: Summer Has Gone 
 2016: The Secret Diary of Retep Nnamffoh aged Fourteen and a Half!: An Edinburgh Schoolboy's 1971 Diary 
 2016: A 1960s Edinburgh Christmas 
 2017: In The Season Of The Year: A Celebration Of 1960s Edinburgh 
 2017: A Life In A Day In A Year: A Postcard From Meadowbank, 1973-1978 
 2018: A 1972 Edinburgh Teenager's Diary: The Growing Pains Of Retep Nnamffoh Aged 15 And A Half 
 2018: A Practical Philosophy of 800 Metres Running: Festina Lente 
 2018: The True Confessions Of Retep Nnamffoh: School's Out For Ever, A 1973 Edinburgh Young Athlete's Diary 
 2018: Oxgangs - A Pastime From Time Past: Spirits Across The Air 
 2019: The Peripatetic Philosopher - An Edinburgh Teenager's Diary 1971-1973 
 2019: Paradise Lost - The Edinburgh Oxgangs School Summer Holidays 1958-1972 
 2020: OXGANGS A Capital Tale Volume 1 
 2020: OXGANGS A Capital Tale Volume 2 
 2021: Two Worlds The Story Of An Edinburgh Doctor 
 2021: You Can Run But You Can't Outrun Yourself: A 1950s Edinburgh Love Story 
 2022: The View in Winter: Running Through the Years 
 2022: Audacity and Idiocy: A Scottish Athlete’s 1978 Commonwealth Games Journal 
 2022: The Letts' Schoolboys 
 2022: I Awoke One Morning And It Was Autumn Volume 1 Sowing 
 2022: I Awoke One Morning And It Was Autumn Volume 2 Growing 
 2022: I Awoke One Morning And It Was Autumn Volume 3 Garnering

See also 
 1975 European Athletics Junior Championships
 1978 European Athletics Championships – Men's 800 metres
 Athletics at the 1978 Commonwealth Games – Men's 800 metres
 1978 UK Athletics Championships

References 

 http://scottish-fencing.co.uk/node/1146
 http://www.cfc18.net/
 http://www.ausfencing.org/home/index.php?option=com_content&view=article&id=6213:2018-cfc18-open-men-s-epee-teams-2&catid=339&Itemid=365
 https://www.scotsman.com/sport/athletics/meadowbank-is-the-stadium-of-dreams-for-peter-hoffman-1-4549399
 https://6oxgangsavenueedinburgh.blogspot.co.uk/
 http://www.anentscottishrunning.com/a-philosophy-of-800m-running-by-peter-hoffman/
 http://www.scottishdistancerunninghistory.scot/peter-hoffman/
 http://www.scottishdistancerunninghistory.scot/peter-hoffmanns-photographs/
 http://www.thepowerof10.info/athletes/profile.aspx?athleteid=39604
https://app.box.com/s/54l6wfn49qb3w0bis6abstlb3aeu75rg
https://app.box.com/s/lre9oebh7l9jehvwxfrkxnlzq882a05v
https://app.box.com/s/rq2w2czj0pfqyd83erqiof4tbkqes72g
https://app.box.com/s/yjdeysq1ldakw3kmlr50dv7jgc1k0s11
http://www.gbrathletics.com/bc/aaai.htm
https://www.scottishathletics.org.uk/wp-content/uploads/2018/03/Scottish-Athletics-Record-Book.pdf
https://www.scotsman.com/news/opinion/peter-hoffmann-a-bad-smell-about-gatlin-s-win-for-many-reasons-1-4527086
https://www.scotsman.com/news/opinion/peter-hoffmann-there-s-no-such-thing-as-total-freedom-of-speech-1-4468552
https://www.scotsman.com/news/opinion/peter-hoffmann-there-s-no-such-thing-as-total-freedom-of-speech-1-4468552
https://www.scotsman.com/news/opinion/peter-hoffmann-the-church-bell-tolls-for-the-spirit-of-community-1-4348967
http://www.lothianlife.co.uk/2014/06/the-end-of-an-era/#more-15274
https://www.pressreader.com/uk/the-scotsman/20170403/281874413251299

1956 births
Sportspeople from Edinburgh
Living people
Scottish male sprinters
British male sprinters
Scottish male middle-distance runners
People educated at Boroughmuir High School